Marta Pascal Capdevila (born 10 April 1983) is a Spanish politician, a Senator of the Parliament of Catalonia. From July 2016 to July 2018, she was general coordinator of the Catalan European Democratic Party (PDeCAT). From October 2012 to February 2015, she was president of the Nationalist Youth of Catalonia, and from July 2015 until its dissolution in July 2016 she was the spokesperson for the Democratic Convergence of Catalonia (CDC).

Biography
Marta Pascal earned licentiates in Political Science and Administration from Pompeu Fabra University and in History from the University of Barcelona.

She completed a leadership program in public management (IESE-Madrid) and is currently participating in the leadership program Vicens Vives (ESADE).

Professionally, she has dedicated herself to the field of educational policies in the International Association of Educating Cities. From 2008 to 2011 she was head of the Department of Education area of the Vic City Council, and from 2011 to 2012 adviser to the Minister of Education of the Catalan government, Irene Rigau.

She is a member of Òmnium Cultural and a patron of the Eduard Soler Foundation-Escuela de Trabajo del Ripollés.

Political and institutional career
Pascal joined the Nationalist Youth of Catalonia (JNC) and the youth group of the Democratic Convergence of Catalonia (CDC). She joined the CDC in 2006.

She was president of the JNC from October 2012 to February 2015. From December 2010 to 2012 she was vice president. From November 2008 to April 2010 she shared responsibility for the JNC's Social Policies and Immigration area, and from April to December 2010 she was secretary of the territory.

She was part of the CDC executives of Vic and Osona, and of the Federation of Central Regions. Beginning in 2010 she was a member of the CDC's National Council.

In the 2012 elections, she was ranked 34th on the Convergence and Union (CiU) list and elected deputy. In the 2015 elections, she renewed her seat, this time on the Junts pel Sí list.

On 23 July 2016, she was elected General Coordinator of the Catalan European Democratic Party (PDeCAT), the inheritor party of the CDC. Pascal won in primaries with 87.76% of the votes over the rival candidacy led by the president of Reagrupament, Ignasi Planas, who received 12.27%.

On 3 May 2018 the Parliament of Catalonia appointed Pascal a Senator by Autonomic Designation.

Judicial case

Resignation as PDeCAT director
At the PDeCAT meeting held on 21 July 2018, Pascal resigned from its leadership, declaring that she did not enjoy the confidence of Carles Puigdemont. At this assembly,  was appointed president of the PDeCAT and it was agreed to join the coalition within the Crida Nacional per la República.

References

External links

 

1983 births
Catalan European Democratic Party politicians
Democratic Convergence of Catalonia politicians
Living people
Members of the 10th Parliament of Catalonia
Members of the 11th Parliament of Catalonia
Women members of the Parliament of Catalonia
21st-century Spanish women politicians
Members of the 12th Parliament of Catalonia
Members of the 12th Senate of Spain
Members of the 13th Senate of Spain
Members of the 14th Senate of Spain
People from Vic
Pompeu Fabra University alumni
University of Barcelona alumni